The following discography of David Lynch, an American director and musician, consists of three studio albums, two collaborative studio albums, six soundtrack albums, two spoken-word albums, one extended play, twenty singles and six music videos.

Lynch's first featured release was the soundtrack to his 1977 debut feature film Eraserhead, which was released on I.R.S. Records and Alternative Tentacles in 1982; he recorded the album with sound designer Alan Splet and co-wrote the song "In Heaven (Lady in the Radiator Song)". In the late 1980s and early 1990s Lynch produced several albums with composer Angelo Badalamenti, who scored Lynch's 1990–1991 television series Twin Peaks and the accompanying 1992 feature film Twin Peaks: Fire Walk with Me. Lynch and Badalamenti's own collaborations for Twin Peaks were released over 15 years later as two soundtrack albums: Twin Peaks Music: Season Two Music and More (2007) and The Twin Peaks Archive (2011–2012). Lynch and Badalamenti also released the soundtrack to Lynch's 2001 feature film Mulholland Drive together.

In 1998 Lynch released his first collaborative studio album, Lux Vivens, with Jocelyn Montgomery. It was engineered by John Neff, with whom Lynch released his first studio album, BlueBOB, in 2001. Lynch released series of recordings in 2007, including the soundtrack to his 2006 feature film Inland Empire; the soundtrack to his 2007 retrospective exhibition The Air Is on Fire; the collaborative studio album Polish Night Music with Marek Zebrowski; and his debut solo single, "Ghost of Love". Lynch subsequently appeared as a guest musician, producer and remixer on several other artists' releases, including Dark Night of the Soul (2010) by Danger Mouse and Sparklehorse and several recordings by Chrysta Bell.

Crazy Clown Time, Lynch's second studio album, was released in November 2011 on PIAS and Sunday Best. Featuring a guest performance by the Yeah Yeah Yeahs vocalist Karen O, it received generally favorable critical acclaim and placed in several international charts. His third studio album, The Big Dream, was released in July 2013 on Sunday Best, Sacred Bones Records and INGRID; The Big Dreams lead single, "I'm Waiting Here", featured guest vocalist Lykke Li. The album received similar favorable reviews and again placed in several international charts.

Albums

Studio albums

Collaborative albums

Soundtrack albums

Spoken-word albums

Extended plays

Singles

Retail singles

Promotional-only singles

Music videos

Appearances

As a guest musician

As a remixer

As a producer

See also
Music of Twin Peaks
David Lynch filmography

Notes

References

External links

Lynch, David
Discography
Lynch, David
Lynch, David
Rock music discographies